Bernard Quennehen (31 May 1930 – January 2016) was a French professional road bicycle racer between 1952 and 1954. He won two stage victories, one in the Circuit des Six Provinces, and one in the 1953 Tour de France, for which he is most remembered.

Major results
1953
Tour de France:
Winner stage 14

References

External links 

Official Tour de France results for Bernard Quennehen

French male cyclists
1930 births
2016 deaths
French Tour de France stage winners
Sportspeople from Amiens
Cyclists from Hauts-de-France